Gmina Dębowiec is a rural gmina (administrative district) in Cieszyn County, Silesian Voivodeship, in southern Poland, in the historical region of Cieszyn Silesia. Its seat is the village of Dębowiec.

Villages

Neighbouring gminas
Gmina Dębowiec is bordered by the gminas of Cieszyn, Goleszów, Hażlach, Skoczów and Strumień.

References

External links
 Official website

Debowiec
Cieszyn County
Cieszyn Silesia